"Crush" is a song by American singer Jennifer Paige. The teen pop song was written by Andy Goldmark, Mark Mueller, Berny Cosgrove and Kevin Clark. It was released as the first single from her debut album, Jennifer Paige (1998). The music video for "Crush" was produced by Kati Haberstok and directed by David Hogan. "Crush" topped the charts in Australia, Canada, and New Zealand while peaking at number three on the US Billboard Hot 100, where it stayed for four consecutive weeks in September 1998. In the United Kingdom, "Crush" reached number four on the UK Singles Chart, and it also reached number four in France. It became a top-20 hit in at least 13 other countries, including Belgium, Germany, Ireland, Italy, the Netherlands, Norway, and Spain.

Background and composition
In April 1998, soon after Paige recorded "Crush," producer Andy Goldmark played the song at top pop Los Angeles radio station KIIS-FM, where it met with a hugely positive reaction from programmers and was added to the station's playlist within days. During the first week of May, KIIS-FM became the first radio station to begin playing "Crush" and it began its meteoric rise up the charts, without typical record company promotion or release. Paige said "we had no pictures, photography, hadn't gotten it mastered or mass-produced it, nothing." Edel Records, Paige's initial label, made an initial press run of 20,000 copies of "Crush" which sold out quickly, and it soon became KIIS-FM's most requested song.

The song, written by Paige's producer Andy Goldmark along with the songwriters Mark Muller, Berny Cosgrove and Kevin Clark, was inspired by Paige's personal experiences and observations in her love life. There have been claims that It was written for Joey Fatone of NSYNC, as she was rumored to be dating him at the time. However, Paige told Disney Chat that they were never in a relationship. The rumors started as they used to run into each other a lot during concerts and TV appearances. One day Paige was given a Superman ring, and as Fatone collects Superman stuff he said it was her engagement ring. "Crush" is written in the key of C♯ minor and follows a tempo of 115 beats per minute. Paige's vocal range spans from G3 to C5.

Critical reception
Billboard wrote that Paige "succeeds in the nearly impossible task of oozing smoldering sensuality without resorting to typical groans and moans. Instead, she uses her notably flexible vocal range to convey the emotion of the tune, quickly soaring to lilting high notes and then dropping to the lowest point of her register to accentuate within the space of several seconds." They stated further that "as a result, she breathes a refreshing intensity into the song that renders it far more sexy than it would have been had she simply taken the easy route. Fortunately, this talented new artist is given a substantial song to work with," adding that producers Andy Goldmark and Jimmy Bralower "surround Paige with tense shuffle beats and twinkly synths". Blender put "Crush" at 189th place on their list of 500 Greatest Songs Since You Were Born. They described the song as "an unusually supple and sophisticated teen-pop hit informed by the level-headed sass of great R&B... swept along by a breathy chorus, pulsing groove and Paige's exquisite multilayered vocals."

Chart performance
"Crush" was an international hit that peaked at number three on the US Billboard Hot 100, earned a Gold certification from the Recording Industry Association of America, and sold 700,000 by the end of 1998. It reached number one in three countries: Australia (two weeks), Canada (five weeks) and New Zealand (one week). In Australia, the song is certified 2× Platinum for more than 140,000 copies shipped, while in New Zealand it is certified Gold for sales of over 5,000. In Europe "Crush" reached number four in France and the United Kingdom, going Gold in both countries, and number six in Ireland, the Netherlands and Norway. It also became a top-ten hit in Austria, Walloon Belgium, Denmark, Hungary and Spain, and it reached the top 20 in Flanders, Germany, Iceland, Sweden and Switzerland.

Live performances and cover versions
In August 1998, Paige made her debut TV appearance singing "Crush" on the ABC TV show Live with Regis and Kathie Lee Paige also performed the show live on the Australian prime time TV show Hey Hey It's Saturday where she was presented an award for platinum sales of "Crush" in Australia. On September 11, 1998, Paige was featured and performed "Crush" on Top of the Pops, which was performed live.

In 2013, a cover of the song by Jai Paul was included on the leaked material that was supposed to be his debut album. The album was officially released to streaming services in 2019, which still included his version of "Crush."

In 2016, "Crush" reached number eight on the US Billboard Smooth Jazz Airplay chart as a cover by jazz keyboardist John Novello. His version features R&B saxophone artist Gerald Albright on the chorus. As of the June 18, 2016, chart, it had spent a total of 19 weeks in the top 30. "Crush" peaked at number five on the Smooth Jazz chart the week of May 24, 2016. This cover version reached number two on America's Smooth Jazz top 20 airplay chart the week of May 28, 2016.

Track listings

Charts

Weekly charts

Year-end charts

Certifications and sales

Release history

References

1998 debut singles
1998 songs
Edel AG singles
Hollywood Records singles
Jennifer Paige songs
Music videos directed by David Hogan
Number-one singles in Australia
Number-one singles in New Zealand
RPM Top Singles number-one singles
Songs written by Andy Goldmark
Songs written by Mark Mueller
Torch songs
UK Independent Singles Chart number-one singles